Peter Alan Rheuben (1931-2014) was an Australian international lawn bowler.

Bowls career

World Championship
Rheuben won the pairs gold medal at the 1980 World Outdoor Bowls Championship in Frankston, Victoria with bowls partner Alf Sandercock. He also won a silver medal in the team event (Leonard Trophy).

Commonwealth Games
Rheuben represented Australia at the 1974 British Commonwealth Games in Christchurch, New Zealand and the 1982 Commonwealth Games where he won a bronze medal in the pairs with Denis Dalton.

Personal life
He was a company director by trade and also represented Eastwood Rugby Club and New South Wales in rugby union against the British Lions in 1953.

Awards
He was inducted into the Australian Hall of Fame.

References

Australian male bowls players
Australian rugby union players
Bowls World Champions
Commonwealth Games medallists in lawn bowls
Commonwealth Games bronze medallists for Australia
1931 births
2014 deaths
Bowls players at the 1974 British Commonwealth Games
Bowls players at the 1982 Commonwealth Games
Medallists at the 1982 Commonwealth Games